Focus peaking is a focusing aid in live preview or electronic viewfinders on digital cameras that places a white or coloured highlight on in-focus edges (contours) within an image using an edge detect filter.

References
http://photolisticlife.com/2013/04/07/what-is-focus-peaking/
http://camera-wiki.org/wiki/Focus_peaking
http://petapixel.com/2012/08/30/focus-peaking-making-its-way-onto-more-digital-cameras/

Digital photography